The Lakeview Resettlement Project Historic District encompasses a significant portion of a Depression-era agricultural resettlement project of the United States federal government in and around Lake View, Arkansas. Roads and houses were built through the area, and a successful farming community eventually arose.

The district was listed on the National Register of Historic Places in 2019.

See also
National Register of Historic Places listings in Phillips County, Arkansas

References

Queen Anne architecture in Arkansas
Colonial Revival architecture in Arkansas
Historic districts on the National Register of Historic Places in Arkansas
National Register of Historic Places in Phillips County, Arkansas
New Deal in Arkansas
African-American history of Arkansas
New Deal subsistence homestead communities